Curtis P. Artz (1915–1977) was an American trauma surgeon and burn care specialist. He served in the U.S. Army working in surgical research, founded and led several organizations dedicated to surgery and burn care, published medical textbooks and academic articles, and taught as a Professor of Surgery at multiple colleges and universities throughout the U.S.

Early life 
Artz was born in central Ohio and went on to earn his bachelor's and M.D. degrees from Ohio State University. There he met his wife, Lucy, and they were married in 1939. In 1940, Artz was a resident at the Camden-Clark Memorial Hospital in Parkersburg, West Virginia, and soon after began general practice in Calhoun County, West Virginia. While working in Calhoun County in 1941, Artz was commended for his treatment of a 64-year-old man who experienced an accident causing severe trauma to his leg. Artz treated the patient using a dried powdered form of blood plasma, as an alternative to blood transfusion, which was a new development in medical technology at the time. An ambulance transported the patient to a nearby hospital in Parkersburg, where Artz successfully amputated the patient's leg. In 1943, Artz treated a three-year-old girl who suffered serious burn injuries, but did not survive.

Military service 
In 1948, Artz joined the United States Army. He worked at several Army hospitals across the country, most notably the Brooke Army Hospital, where he became Chief of Research and Commanding Officer of the US Army Surgical Research Unit.

During the Korean War, Artz served as director of the 46th Mobile Army Surgical Hospital. There his team treated over 250 patients with battle wounds, mostly abdominal wounds, and focused on reducing fatalities among trauma patients. The patients were the subject of four volumes of published research. In 1956, Artz suffered a heart attack and was medically discharged.

Contributions 

In 1960, Artz and James Hardy co-authored the textbook Complications in Surgery, which covered everything from wounds to organ transplants. The textbook soon became standard reading for resident surgeons.

In 1967, Artz worked with biomechanical engineer Tom Hargest to patent the air-fluidized bed, which eliminates the need for manually turning wound care patients. The bed, marketed by the SSI as the Clinitron bed, gives the patient a sensation of "floating" by allowing their body weight to be evenly distributed across a large surface area. The bed also uses pressurized warm air to move small ceramic beads around under the patient, encouraging the continuous movement and circulation of fluid.

Involvement in organizations 
Throughout his career, Artz served as a leader and founder of multiple organizations.

The Medical University of South Carolina Curtis P. Artz Surgical Society, an organization for alumni of the school's surgical residency program, was founded and named after him in 1974.

See also 
James Hardy

Brooke Army Medical Center

American Burn Association

References 

American surgeons
1915 births
1977 deaths

United States Army personnel of the Korean War
20th-century American physicians
20th-century surgeons
Ohio State University alumni
Medical University of South Carolina alumni